Kyle Molnar is an American professional baseball pitcher for the Los Angeles Angels organization.

Molnar graduated from Aliso Niguel High School and enrolled at the University of California, Los Angeles (UCLA), where he played college baseball for the UCLA Bruins. The Los Angeles Angels selected him in the 26th round of the 2019 MLB draft.

References

External links

Year of birth missing (living people)
Living people
Place of birth missing (living people)
UCLA Bruins baseball players
Baseball pitchers